Steinheim am Albuch is a municipality in the district of Heidenheim in Baden-Württemberg in southern Germany. Steinheim is known for its meteorite crater.

References

Heidenheim (district)